Auratonota cataponera is a species of moth of the family Tortricidae. It is found in Ecuador.

The wingspan is about 18 mm. It is similar to Auratonota splendida, but the forewings are narrower and the fasciae are blackish brown, broad and dotted yellowish.

References

Moths described in 2000
Auratonota
Moths of South America